San Antonio Pajonal is a city and municipality in the Santa Ana department of El Salvador. A village of the same name was founded in the 19th century while the municipality was created on November 13, 1945. It's very quiet and attracts some tourists.

References 

Municipalities of the Santa Ana Department